The Secretary of State for Migration (SEM) is a senior official of the Ministry of Labour, Migrations and Social Security responsible for developing the government's policy on foreigners, immigration and emigration. It also attends and advises the minister in the international meetings about these matters, especially in the European Union meetings.

The SEM is appointed by the Monarch with the advice of the Labour Minister. From the Secretary of State depends a single department, the General Secretariat for Immigration and Emigration, body that in other times has assumed the functions of the secretariat of state.

History
Since its inception and its worldwide expansion, Spain has always been a country that has received and sent large amounts of population. Most of the South American population and in a lesser amount the North American population, descends from Spanish ancestry.

That has provoke that a common culture and language link dozens of countries of all the world, not just Latin American countries but also Asian countries like the Philippines, African countries like Morocco or Equatorial Guinea and North American countries like United States and Canada.

It is not clear when migratory issues took center stage within the Spanish administration, although there is evidence that in 1882, a section was created inside the Ministry of Development destinated to these matters. Before this, there are documents that proves that the Ministry of the Interior, the Ministry of the Navy and the Ministry of Overseas were in charge of overseeing the migrations in the Peninsular Spain and in the Spanish territories in the Americas, Africa, Asia and Oceania and that there were also parliamentary committees to discuss migrations matters.

In the 1920s, the Ministry of Labour assumed the competencies over immigration and emigration that still today maintains. During the dictatorship of Franco, in 1956, it was created the Spanish Institute for Emigration in order to control the emigration of the Spanish population, trying to direct it to countries with cultural links like South American's. This was done through collecting labor information abroad to offer Spaniards more attractive jobs in this type of countries.

In 1985, the Institute was transformed into a Directorate-General being called Directorate-General of the Spanish Institute for Emigration. The name of this directorate was changed in 1991 to Directorate-General for Migration, a more accurate name because since 1985 this directorate had competences not only over emigration, but also over all kind of migrations.

The Directorate-General change its name many times, in 1996 to Directorate-General for Labor and Migration and in 1998 Directorate General for the Regulation of Migrations.

In 2004 was created the current Secretariat of State under the name of Secretariat of State of Immigration and Emigration and depending on it were three directorate-generals: Directorate-General for Immigration, Directorate-General for Emigration and Directorate-General for the Integration of Immigrants. This Secretariat of State was replaced in 2011 by the General Secretariat of Immigration and Emigration and was created again in 2018 by the name of Secretariat of State for Migration and the former General Secretariat of Immigration and Emigration was integrated as a subsidiary department of it.

Structure
Under the Secretary of State are the following officials:
 The General Secretariat for Immigration and Emigration.
 The Directorate-General for Migration.
 It is in charge of all administrative affairs regarding immigration and the administrative affairs and public aids to support Spaniards abroad
 The Directorate-General for Integration and Humanitarian Attention.
 It is in charge of immigration issues related to international protection, integration of immigrants and unaccompanied minors, humanitarian aid to immigrants, voluntary return of immigrants, migration centers and European funds.
 The Deputy Directorate-General for Planning and Economic Management.
 It is in charge of the human resources of the Secretariat of State, the relations with citizens and the economic affairs and budget.
 The Deputy Directorate-General for Legal Affairs.
 It makes reports and offers legal advice as well as writing the legislation that is entrusted to it regarding migration issues.

The SED also has a personal Cabinet for the coordination of the Secretary of State' activities within the European Union and other international forums and organizations in matters of migration.

List of Secretaries of State for Migration

References

Secretaries of State of Spain